Geoffrey Templeman  (15 February 1914 - 22 February 1988) was Vice-Chancellor of the University of Kent at Canterbury, 1963–1980.  He was appointed a CBE in 1980. The Templeman Library at the Canterbury campus of the University of Kent is named after him.

References 

 ‘TEMPLEMAN, Geoffrey’, Who Was Who, A & C Black, 1920–2008; online edn, Oxford University Press, Dec 2007 accessed 28 July 2011

1914 births
1988 deaths
Commanders of the Order of the British Empire
Fellows of the Society of Antiquaries of London
Vice-Chancellors of the University of Kent